William 'Red' McKenzie (October 14, 1899 – February 7, 1948) was an American jazz vocalist and musician who played a comb as an instrument. He played the comb-and-paper by placing paper, sometimes strips from the Evening World, over the tines and blowing on it, producing a sound like a kazoo.

Career
He was born in St. Louis, Missouri, United States. In 1923, he founded the Mound City Blue Blowers, with Jack Bland and Dick Slevin. Later they were later joined by guitarist Eddie Lang. The quartet also used the name Red McKenzie and the Candy Kids. In 1929, the Blue Blowers recorded the songs "One Hour" and "Hello Lola" with Glenn Miller, Pee Wee Russell, and Coleman Hawkins. They also recorded with Bunny Berigan, Jimmy Dorsey, and Muggsy Spanier. McKenzie sang with the Paul Whiteman orchestra and in the 1930s led the Spirits of Rhythm and the Farley-Riley band.

In 1931, he sang on "Time on My Hands, "Just Friends" (1931), and "I'm Sorry Dear" (1931). McKenzie played in the Town Hall concerts of Eddie Condon, but retired in the 1940s.

References

Sources
Roger D. Kinkle, The Complete Encyclopedia of Popular Music and Jazz, 1900–1950 (Arlington House Publishers, 1974)

1899 births
1948 deaths
American jazz musicians
Jazz musicians from Missouri
Deaths from cirrhosis
20th-century American musicians
McKenzie and Condon's Chicagoans members
Spirits of Rhythm members